Mai Huong Hospital (or Mai Huong Day Psychiatric Hospital) - a hospital in Hanoi (Vietnam) specialized in mental health.

The hospital provides psychotherapy, medical treatment, consultations, rehabilitation services and is sponsored by Centre for International Mental Health of the University of Melbourne.

The programs for free mental check-ups and counselling for students and schoolchildren are regularly held.

See also
List of hospitals in Vietnam.

References

External links 
 Mai Huong Hospital Web Page

Hospitals in Hanoi
Hospitals with year of establishment missing